Rajaditya Chola (fl. mid-10th century AD) was a Chola prince, son of king Parantaka I (r. 907–955) and a Chera/Kerala princess (the Ko Kizhan Adigal), known for commanding the Chola troops in the battle of Takkolam (948–949).

The death of prince Rajaditya in the battle is unusually commemorated by the Cholas. The Chola version of the events can be found in Larger Leiden Grant (1006 AD) of Rajaraja I and Tiruvalangadu Plates (1018 AD) of Rajendra Chola. An account of the battle, which differs in some details from the Chola version, is found in the Atakur inscription issued by Krishna III and prince Butuga II (a young underlord of Krishna III) of the Western Ganga family. The Sravana Belgola record of Ganga king Marasimha (963 - 975 AD) also claims victory of the Chera king for his predecessor Bhutuga II. Indirect references to the battle can also be found in the inscriptions of Vellan Kumaran, a Kerala commander in the Chola army.

Early life 
Rajaditya was the son of the Ko Kizhan Atikal, the Chera Perumal princess, and the Chola king Parantaka I (r. 907–955 AD). King Parantaka I is known to have married two distinct Chera princesses, Ko Kizhan Adigal and Kizhan Adikal Ravi Neeli (the mothers of his two sons, Rajaditya and Arinjaya Chola). The marriage between a Chera princess and Parantaka, c. 910 CE, is mentioned in the Udayendiram plates of Ganga king Prthivipati II Hastimalla.

It seems that Chola king Parantaka I anticipated a climactic battle with the Rashtrakutas and their allies in Tirumunaippati Nadu. Sometime in the 930s, or perhaps as early as 923 AD, prince Rajaditya was sent with a substantial military contingent, including elephants and horses, as well as his entire household, to Rajadityapura (Tirunavalur/Tirumanallur) in Tirumunaippati Nadu (to protect the northern edges of a nascent Chola state). The prince was joined at Rajadityapura by his mother (the Chera princess Ko Kizhan Adikal) in the mid-930s and his half-brother Arinjaya. Rajaditya was supported by a number of military personnel from Kerala (Chera) chiefdoms in Tirumunaippati Nadu.

Battle of Takkolam
Battle of Takkolam, Takkolam is a town in Arakkonam taluk of the Vellore district, northern Tamil Nadu.

The Rashtrakuta cont at Takkolam included a collection of feudal militias and royal soldiers (from Western Gangas, Banas and Vaidumbas among others). Prince Rajaditya, in addition to the Chola warriors, was supported by a number of military personnel from Kerala (Chera) chiefdoms.

The Battle of Takkolam fought in 948-49 CE resulted in the death of Rajaditya on the battlefield and the defeat of the Chola garrison at Takkolam. According to the Atakur inscription, during the battle, Rajaditya was struck while seated atop his war elephant by an arrow from prince Butuga II. The Chola prince died instantly. The Chola army was subsequently defeated and retreated in disorder. The collapse of the Chola resistance after the battle of Takkolam lead to the virtual destruction of the Chola empire.

Here is an excerpt from Atakur inscription :

The subsidiary record engraved on the upper part of slab throws some more light on the incident:

Chola-Chera Perumal relations (c. 9th-10th centuries AD)

References

Further reading
 George Spencer, 'Ties that Bound', P. F. I. S. A. S. (Hong Kong: Asian Research Service, 1982), 723.
Daud Ali. 'The Death of a Friend'. Studies in History, vol. 33, no. 1, 2017, pp. 36–60.
M. G. S. Narayanan, Perumāḷs of Kerala. Thrissur (Kerala): CosmoBooks, 2013.
Epigraphia Indica
Epigraphia Indica 6 (1900–01), no. 6c: 53–56
Epigraphia Indica 22 (1933–34), no. 34: vv. 19–21.
Epigraphia Indica 27 (1947–48), no. 47: 293–96.
South Indian Inscriptions
South Indian Inscriptions 2 (1895), no. 76: v. 8.
South Indian Inscriptions 7 (1932), No. 1009.
South Indian Inscriptions 3 (1920), no. 205: v. 54.

Chola dynasty
Tamil monarchs
949 deaths
Year of birth unknown